Chetia is a genus of haplochromine cichlids endemic to riverine habitats in southern Africa, as well as the Congo River Basin.

Species
There are currently six recognized species in this genus:
 Chetia brevicauda I. R. Bills & Olaf, 2002
 Chetia brevis R. A. Jubb, 1968 (Orange-fringed Largemouth)
 Chetia flaviventris Trewavas, 1961 (Canary Kurper)
 Chetia gracilis (Greenwood, 1984) (Slender Happy)
 Chetia mola Balon & D. J. Stewart, 1983
 Chetia welwitschi (Boulenger, 1898) (Angolan Happy)

References

External links
Canary Kurper

 
Haplochromini
Cichlid fish of Africa
Taxa named by Ethelwynn Trewavas